Cifarelli is an Italian surname. Notable people with the surname include:

Dominic Cifarelli (born 1979), Canadian musician
Lucia Cifarelli (born 1970), American musician
Nicholas J. Cifarelli (1928–2005), American physician
Philip S. Cifarelli (1935–2008), American physician and lawyer

Italian-language surnames